Julie Slama (born May 2, 1996) is an American politician who serves in the Nebraska Legislature from the 1st district since 2019.

Early life
Julie Slama was born on May 2, 1996.  She graduated from Auburn High School in 2014. She graduated from Yale University with a bachelor's degree in political science in 2018. During her time at Yale she was the director of operations for Yale Daily News. She is attending the University of Nebraska–Lincoln.

Slama was an alternate delegate to the 2014 United States Senate Youth Program. During the 2018 gubernatorial election she worked as the press secretary for Pete Ricketts's gubernatorial campaign.

Slama's twin sister, Emily, was appointed by Ricketts to the Sarpy County Election Commission in October 2021. She married former state senator Andrew La Grone in December 2021.

Nebraska Legislature

Elections
Dan Watermeier, a member of the Nebraska Legislature from the 1st district, was elected to the Nebraska Public Service Commission in 2018, and vacated his seat. Slama applied for the position and was appointed to the seat by Ricketts. She was the youngest member of the legislature's 2019 session and the third-youngest person to serve in the state legislature.

Slama announced her campaign for the 2020 election on July 10, 2019, and placed first in the primary against Janet Palmtag and Dennis Schaardt. She defeated Palmtag, who had the endorsement of former Governor Dave Heineman and U.S. Representative Jeff Fortenberry. Jessica Flanagain was her campaign manager.

Tenure
During Slama's tenure in the state legislature she has served on the Judiciary committee. In 2021, she sought the position of vice-chair of the Executive Committee, but lost to Senator Tony Vargas.

Slama was named legislator of the year by the Young Republicans and placed on the Forbes 30 Under 30 in 2019. In 2022, Slama accused Charles Herbster of reaching up into her skirt at a event hosted by the Douglas County Republican Party in 2019. Both filed lawsuits against each other, but later dropped their lawsuits.

Political positions
Slama proposed legislation to require students in 8th and 11th grade to pass the American Civics Test. She proposed legislation to expand the castle doctrine to include occupied vehicles. She supported an attempt to call a special legislative session to pass legislation to prohibit vaccine requirements by businesses, governmental entities, and schools. She opposed expanding Supplemental Nutrition Assistance Program benefits to people with felony drug convictions.

She opposes abortion in all cases, including when the life of the mother is at risk. She proposed a Heartbeat bill in 2022.

Slama proposed a constitutional amendment to require voter ID in order to vote. She proposed legislation to alter Nevada's selection of presidential electors by switching to having them selected through winner-take-all. She proposed a constitutional amendment to make the state legislature partisan.

References

1996 births
21st-century American women politicians
21st-century American politicians
Living people
Politicians from Lincoln, Nebraska
Republican Party Nebraska state senators
Women state legislators in Nebraska